Brodersen is a surname. Notable people with the surname include:

Arvid Brodersen (1904–1996), Norwegian sociologist
Friedrich Brodersen (1873–1926), German opera singer
Kai Brodersen (born 1958), German historian and classical scholar
Robert W. Brodersen (born 1945), American electrical engineer
Viggo Brodersen (1879–1965), Danish classical composer and pianist

See also
17965 Brodersen, a main-belt asteroid